The 2020 Cadel Evans Great Ocean Road Race was a road cycling race that was held on 2 February 2020 in Geelong, Australia. It was the sixth edition of the Cadel Evans Great Ocean Road Race and the second event of the 2020 UCI World Tour.

The race was won in a two-up sprint by Dries Devenyns of the  team, ahead of  rider Pavel Sivakov, with 's Daryl Impey finishing third for the third year in succession.

Teams
Sixteen teams entered the race, which consisted of fifteen of the nineteen UCI WorldTeams, along with an Australian national team. Of the starting peloton of 108 riders, 95 finished.

UCI WorldTeams

 
 
 
 
 
 
 
 
 
 
 
 
 
 
 

National Teams

 Australia

Result

References

External links
 

Cadel Evans Great Ocean Road Race
Cadel Evans Great Ocean Road Race
Cadel Evans Great Ocean Road Race
Cadel Evans Great Ocean Road Race